Londina Illustrata. Graphic and Historic Memorials of Monasteries, Churches, Chapels, Schools, Charitable Foundations, Palaces, Halls, Courts, Processions, Places of Early Amusement and Modern & Present Theatres, In the Cities and Suburbs of London & Westminster was a book published in two volumes by Robert Wilkinson in 1819 & 1825, that had initially been released with William Herbert as groups of engravings between 1808 and 1819 which featured topographical illustrations by some of the foremost engravers and illustrators of the day, of the cities of London and Westminster, the county of Middlesex and some areas south of the River Thames, then in Surrey, such as Southwark.

Most of the plates carry names of the draughtsman and engraver. A few early artists are included such as Wenceslaus Hollar. More recent draughtsmen included Robert Blemmell Schnebbelie, Frederick Nash, William Capon, George Jones, H. Gardner, George Shepherd, William Goodman, C.J.M. Whichelo, John Carter, Fellows, C. Westmacott, E. Burney, Bartholomew Howlett, Thomas H. Shepherd, Banks, Ravenhill, William Oram. Engravers include James Stow, T. Dale, Bartholomew Howlett, John Whichelo, W. Wise, Samuel Rawle, T. Bourne, H. Cook, M. Springsguth, Wenceslaus Hollar, Joseph Skelton, Israel Silvestre, Richard Sawyer, S. Springsguth junr., Taylor.

References

External links 
 
 Londina Illustrata - Graphic and Historic Memorials of Monasteries, Churches, Chapels, Schools, Charitable Foundations, Palaces, Halls, Courts etc. Volume the First published 1819 by Robert Wilkinson (full text scan at the Internet Archive)
 Londina Illustrata - Graphic and Historic Memorials of Ancient Playhouses, Modern Theatres and Other Places of Public Amusement etc. Volume the Second published 1825 by Robert Wilkinson (full text scan at the Internet Archive)

1808 non-fiction books
1819 non-fiction books
1825 non-fiction books
Books about London
History books about London
Topography
19th-century engravings